Lac Blanc is a lake in Haut-Rhin, France. At an elevation of 1055 m, its surface area is 0.29 km².

Blanc
L Lac Blanc